Formigny La Bataille is a commune in the department of Calvados, northwestern France. The municipality was established on 1 January 2017 by merger of the former communes of Formigny (the seat), Aignerville, Écrammeville and Louvières.

See also 
Communes of the Calvados department

References 

Communes of Calvados (department)
Populated places established in 2017
2017 establishments in France